Hélène Kaziendé (born August 15, 1967) is a Nigerien educator, journalist and writer.

She was born in Niamey. Her short story "Le Déserteur" (The Deserter) won a prize at a competition organized by radio station Africa No. 1. It was included in the collection Kilomètre 30. Afrique: 30 ans d'indépendance, published in 1992. Since 1996, Kaziendé has been living in Togo.

Selected works
 Aydia, novel (2006)
 Les fers de l'absence, novel (2011)

References 

1967 births
Living people
Nigerien novelists
Nigerien women writers
Nigerien short story writers
Women novelists
Women short story writers
20th-century short story writers
21st-century novelists
20th-century women writers
21st-century women writers
People from Niamey
Nigerien expatriates in Togo